The 1939 Australian Championships was a tennis tournament that took place on outdoor Grass courts at the Kooyong Stadium in Melbourne, Australia from 20 January to 30 January. It was the 32nd edition of the Australian Championships (now known as the Australian Open), the 9th held in Melbourne, and the first Grand Slam tournament of the year. Australians John Bromwich and Emily Hood Westacott won the singles titles.

Finals

Men's singles

 John Bromwich defeated  Adrian Quist  6–4, 6–1, 6–3

Women's singles

 Emily Hood Westacott defeated  Nell Hall Hopman  6–1, 6–2

Men's doubles

 John Bromwich /  Adrian Quist defeated  Colin Long /  Don Turnbull 6–4, 7–5, 6–2

Women's doubles

 Thelma Coyne /  Nancye Wynne defeated  May Hardcastle /  Emily Hood Westacott 7–5, 6–4

Mixed doubles

 Nell Hall Hopman /  Harry Hopman defeated  Margaret Wilson /  John Bromwich 6–8, 6–3, 6–2

References

External links
 Australian Open official website

1939 in Australian tennis
1939
January 1939 sports events